Synchlora gerularia is a moth in the family Geometridae. It is found from Texas in the southern United States through Central America to Argentina in South America. It is also found on the Antilles.

The wingspan is about 16–20 mm.

The larvae feed on various Asteraceae species, including Baccharis genistelloides and Baccharis salicina.

References

Moths described in 1823
Synchlorini